The Peronist Armed Forces (FAP) was an Argentine left-wing Peronist urban guerrilla group created in 1968 active during the 1960s and 1970s. The organization apply strike directly against the Argentina state forces. Led by Envar Cacho El Kadri. His appearance came on 17 September 1968 with an unsuccessful armed action in Taco Ralo, Tucumán. 
By 1971 the organization split into FAP Comando Central and a minority faction known as FAP 17. The former preferred armed struggle over the election of Perón as strategy while the latter joined Tendencia Revolucionaria.

See also
Montoneros
People's Revolutionary Army
Amanda Peralta
Orthodox Peronism

References

1968 establishments in Argentina
Guerrilla movements in Latin America
History of Argentina (1955–1973)
History of Argentina (1973–1976)
Left-wing militant groups
Left-wing politics in Argentina
Peronism
Terrorism in Argentina
Paramilitary organisations based in Argentina